Hans Andersen (16 October 1905 – 31 March 1969) was a Norwegian footballer. He played in one match for the Norway national football team in 1937.

References

External links
 
 

1905 births
1969 deaths
Norwegian footballers
Norway international footballers
Association football defenders
Mjøndalen IF players